Philampelini is a tribe of moths of the family Sphingidae.

Taxonomy 
Genus Eumorpha - Hübner, 1807
Genus Tinostoma - Rothschild & Jordan, 1903

 
Macroglossinae (moth)
Taxa named by Hermann Burmeister
Lepidoptera tribes